Arambagh Girls' College, established in 1995, is a girls' college in Arambagh, in Hooghly district, India. It offers undergraduate courses in arts. It is affiliated to  University of Burdwan.

Departments

Arts

Bengali
English
Sanskrit
History
Geography
Political Science
Philosophy
Sociology
Education

Accreditation
The college is recognized by the University Grants Commission (UGC).

References

External links
 

Colleges affiliated to University of Burdwan
Educational institutions established in 1995
Universities and colleges in Hooghly district
Women's universities and colleges in West Bengal
1995 establishments in West Bengal